The 2018 Hawaii gubernatorial election took place on November 6, 2018, to elect the Governor of Hawaii and Lieutenant Governor of Hawaii.

After prevailing in an intensely competitive primary election on August 11, 2018, incumbent Democratic Governor David Ige ran successfully for re-election to a second term in office, considerably improving on his margin of victory from 2014, in which he only won a plurality.

Republicans Andria Tupola and Marissa Kerns headed one of two 2018 major-party gubernatorial tickets that included two women. The other such ticket had Idaho's 2018 Democratic nominees for Governor and Lieutenant Governor, Paulette Jordan and Kristin Collum. This was Hawaii's only gubernatorial election since 1994 without Linda Lingle or Duke Aiona as the Republican nominee, as well as the first since the 1990 election in which the winner was of a different party than the incumbent president.

Democratic primary

Governor

Candidates

Declared
 Ernest Caravalho, Democratic Party of Hawaii, chair, House District 29
 Colleen Hanabusa, U.S. Representative and candidate for the U.S. Senate in 2014
 David Ige, incumbent governor
 Wendell Kaehuaea, security guard and perennial candidate
 Van Tanabe

Withdrew
 Clayton Hee, former state senator and candidate for lieutenant governor in 2014

Debates

Endorsements

Polling

Results

Lieutenant governor

Candidates

Declared
 Bernard Carvalho, Mayor of Kauai County
 Will Espero, State Senate Vice President and candidate for HI-01 in 2014
 Josh Green, state senator
 Kim Coco Iwamoto, former state Board of Education member
 Jill Tokuda, State Senator

Withdrew
 Alan Arakawa, Mayor of Maui County (running for Maui County Council)

Endorsements

Polling

Results

Republican primary

Governor

Candidates

Declared
 John Carroll, former state representative, and former state senator
 Ray L'Heureux,  president and chairman of the Education Institute of Hawaii, former assistant superintendent, and retired U.S. Marine colonel
 Andria Tupola, Minority Leader of the Hawaii House of Representatives

Withdrew
 Bob McDermott, state representative and nominee for HI-02 in 2002

Endorsements

Polling

Results

Lieutenant governor

Candidates

Declared
 Marissa Kerns
 Steve Lipscomb
 Jeremy Low

Polling

Results

Green primary

Governor

Candidates

Declared
 Jim Brewer

Results

Lieutenant governor

Candidates

Declared
 Renee Ing

Results

Nonpartisan primary

Governor

Candidates

Declared
 Selina Blackwell
 Link El
 Terrence Teruya

Results

Lieutenant governor

Candidates

Declared
 Ernest Magaoay
 Paul Robotti

Results

General election

Predictions

Debates

Polling

with David Ige and John Carroll

with David Ige and Raymond L'Heureux

with Colleen Hanabusa and John Carroll

with Colleen Hanabusa and Andria Tupola

with Colleen Hanabusa and Raymond L'Heureux

Results

References

External links
Candidates at Vote Smart
Candidates at Ballotpedia

Official campaign websites
David Ige (D) for Governor
Terrence Teruya (NP) for Governor
Andria Tupola (R) for Governor

Official lieutenant gubernatorial campaign websites
Josh Green (D) for Lieutenant Governor
Marissa Kerns (R) for Lieutenant Governor

gubernatorial
Hawaii
Hawaii gubernatorial elections